The men's shot put event at the 2020 Summer Olympics took place between 3 and 5 August 2021 at the Japan National Stadium. Thirty-one athletes from 22 nations competed. For the first time in Olympic history, the same three competitors received the same medals in back-to-back editions of an individual event. Americans Ryan Crouser and Joe Kovacs and New Zealander Tom Walsh repeated their gold, silver, and bronze (respectively) performances from the 2016 Summer Olympics. They became the 15th, 16th, and 17th men to earn multiple medals in the shot put; Crouser was the 4th to repeat as champion.

Background
This was the 29th appearance of the event, which is one of 12 athletics events to have been held at every Summer Olympics.

At the US Trials, Ryan Crouser broke the 29 year old world record by 25 centimetres. He was already the defending Olympic Champion. But the entire podium returned from Rio and silver medalist Joe Kovacs beat Crouser at the 2019 World Championships. And bronze medalist Thomas Walsh matched Crouser at those championships which Walsh had won in 2017. Kovacs and Walsh were =#4 and #6 of all time respectively with their marks from that 2019 competition. #11 Darlan Romani, #17 Michał Haratyk, #19 Konrad Bukowiecki, #21 Bob Bertemes and #25 Tomáš Staněk were also in the field.

Bahrain made its men's shot put debut. The United States made its 28th appearance, most of any nation, having missed only the boycotted 1980 Games.

Summary

Haratyk, Bukowiecki, Bertemes and Staněk didn't make the final.

On his first attempt of the final, Crouser threw 22.83 metres to improve upon his own Olympic Record from Rio. Romani threw 21.88 metres to take second for a few moments until Kovacs threw 22.19 metres. Crouser's second round throw improved the Olympic Record again, 22.93 metres. Only two other men had ever thrown that far, over 30 years before. Walsh got into the mix with 22.17 metres. After the throwers were re-ordered, Kovacs threw 22.65 metres to solidify his hold on silver. That looked significant because on his final attempt, Walsh dropped a 22.47 metres, better than Kovacs' four other throws. Kovacs answered with a 22.60 metres, not enough to catch Crouser. So with gold assured, Crouser wound up for one more throw, ; the second farthest throw in history, his third Olympic Record of the series and just 7 centimetres short of his month-old world record. Every one of Crouser's 6 throw series was farther than all but ten men have ever thrown. Crouser joined Ralph Rose (1904 & 1908), Parry O'Brien (1952 & 1956) (also Americans) and Tomasz Majewski of Poland (2008 & 2012), as the only men to defend their Olympic title in the shot put. For the first time in Olympic history the podium was a repeat of the previous Games, with Kovacs silver and Walsh bronze.

Qualification

A National Olympic Committee (NOC) could enter up to 3 qualified athletes in the men's shot put event if all athletes meet the entry standard or qualify by ranking during the qualifying period. (The limit of 3 has been in place since the 1930 Olympic Congress.) The qualifying standard is 21.10 metres. This standard was "set for the sole purpose of qualifying athletes with exceptional performances unable to qualify through the IAAF World Rankings pathway." The world rankings, based on the average of the best five results for the athlete over the qualifying period and weighted by the importance of the meet, will then be used to qualify athletes until the cap of 32 is reached.

The qualifying period was originally from 1 May 2019 to 29 June 2020. Due to the COVID-19 pandemic, the period was suspended from 6 April 2020 to 30 November 2020, with the end date extended to 29 June 2021. The world rankings period start date was also changed from 1 May 2019 to 30 June 2020; athletes who had met the qualifying standard during that time were still qualified, but those using world rankings would not be able to count performances during that time. The qualifying time standards could be obtained in various meets during the given period that have the approval of the IAAF. Both outdoor and indoor meets are eligible. The most recent Area Championships may be counted in the ranking, even if not during the qualifying period.

NOCs can also use their universality place—each NOC can enter one male athlete regardless of time if they had no male athletes meeting the entry standard for an athletics event—in the shot put.

Entry number: 32. No ranking necessary to complete the field.

Competition format
The 2020 competition continued to use the two-round format with divided final introduced in 1936. The qualifying round gave each competitor three throws to achieve a qualifying distance (not yet set; 2016 used 20.65 metres); if fewer than 12 men did so, the top 12 would advance. The final provided each thrower with three throws; the top eight throwers received an additional three throws for a total of six, with the best to count (qualifying round throws were not considered for the final).

Records
Prior to this competition, the existing world, Olympic, and area records were as follows.

The following record was established during the competition:

Schedule
All times are Japan Standard Time (UTC+9)

The men's shot put took place over two separate days.

Results

Qualifying
Qualification Rules: Qualifying performance 21.20 (Q) or at least 12 best performers (q) advance to the Final.

Final

References

Men's shot put
2020
Men's events at the 2020 Summer Olympics